Dhingra is an Arora Khatri surname. 

Madan Lal Dhingra was the first Indian revolutionary freedom fighter in the 20th century.

References

Indian surnames
Surnames of Indian origin
Punjabi tribes
Arora clans
Punjabi-language surnames
Hindu surnames
Khatri clans
Khatri surnames